The Union for Progress and Reform (UPC) is a political party in Burkina Faso. The party describes itself as non-ideological.

History

The UPC was established by Zéphirin Diabré in 2010 after he left the ruling Congress for Democracy and Progress (CDP). It finished third in the popular vote in the 2012 parliamentary elections with 11%, winning 19 of the 127 seats in the National Assembly, becoming the second-largest party after the CDP. In the 2015 general elections it received 21% of the vote, winning 33 seats. Its presidential candidate Zéphirin Diabré finished second with 30% of the vote.

References

2010 establishments in Burkina Faso
Centrist parties in Africa
Liberal International
Liberal parties in Africa
Political parties established in 2010
Political parties in Burkina Faso